Ghassan El Khatib is a Lebanese diplomat currently serving as Lebanon ambassador to Turkey. He presented his letter of credence to Turkish president Recep Tayyip Erdoğan on 23 August 2018. Khatib previously served as Lebanon ambassador to Algeria.

References 

Lebanese diplomats
Year of birth missing (living people)
Living people
Ambassadors of Lebanon to Turkey